Spodnje Laže is a settlement in the Municipality of Slovenske Konjice in eastern Slovenia. It lies on the left bank of the Dravinja River. The railway line from Celje to Pragersko runs through the settlement. The area is part of the traditional region of Styria. The municipality is now included in the Savinja Statistical Region.

References

External links

Spodnje Laže at Geopedia

Populated places in the Municipality of Slovenske Konjice